Has God Seen My Shadow is a three-disc compilation album by Mark Lanegan, featuring songs from his releases between 1989-2011. It was released in January 2014 under Light in the Attic Records.

Recording
The first two discs in the set contain tracks from his solo albums, while the third disc contains previously unreleased songs from various time frames and recording sessions. (The set does not include material from Lanegan's numerous collaborations during this period with the likes of Queens of the Stone Age, Twilight Singers, Soulsavers, or Isobel Campbell.)  In his book I Am the Wolf: Lyrics & Writings, the singer sheds light on the origins of some of the unreleased tunes:

 "'To Valencia Courthouse' was literally written in the back seat of a car while on my way to a court appearance in Valencia, California..."

 "'Dream Lullabye' was my response to a challenge from a close friend and fellow gutter twin Greg Dulli to write an unabashed pretty song..." 

 "Dylan Carlson is the 'D' from 'Blues for D,' a song about absent friends, like on Seattle's first hill, and the hard times we shared there."

 "'Leaving New River Blues' was recorded with a four-track machine in a hotel room on the Gold Coast of Australia and on the surface is about the disintegration of my brief, ill-fated first marriage, but like most of my songs is really just about myself."

Natasha Shneider sings on the track "Sympathy."

Track list

References

Mark Lanegan albums
2014 compilation albums
Light in the Attic Records compilation albums